Bron is a town in France.

Bron may also refer to:

 Bron (surname)
 Bron Taylor (born 1955), American professor and conservationist
 Bron (cant)
 Bron Studios, a Canadian film and television production company
 Bron Elektronik, a Swiss manufacturer of flash equipment for photography
 Bron (comics), a character in the comic book Scion
 The Bridge (Scandinavian TV series), or Bron (2011–2018) 
 Bron, a character in The Patterns of Chaos by Colin Kapp
 Bron, a character in The Land Before Time series
LeBron James, American basketball player

See also
 Bron-Yr-Aur, a house in Gwynedd, Wales
 Bisphosphonate-associated osteonecrosis of the jaw or BRONJ, a complication of certain dental procedures for patients on bisphosphonate therapy
 Bronn (disambiguation)
 Brons